"Do or Not" (stylized as DO or NOT)  is a song recorded by South Korean boy group Pentagon, released on March 15, 2021, by Cube Entertainment as the second track and lead single of the group's eleventh extended play, Love or Take written and produced by members Hui and Wooseok, alongside Nathan. The song is a refreshing Pentagon-style song that follows the footsteps of their other songs like "Shine", "Spring Snow" and "Daisy". 

English and Chinese versions of the song were released together as a digital single on April 9, 2021. A Japanese version of "Do or Not" was released as the lead single of their EP of the same name on June 14, 2021.

Composition and lyrics
The song is composed in the key of C major, 130 beats per minute with a running time of 3:08 minutes. "Do or Not" has a genre of pop rock that shows Pentagon's own unique musical and narrative style where 8 members become main characters of a romantic comic. The lyrics "Say you like it or not', 'Just make up your mind now' illustrate one's cautious inner side and genuine feelings of being desperate while waiting for other person's answer, but at the same time looking witty and nonchalant.

Critical reception
Puah Ziwei of NME praised that the group's "sub-vocalists Shinwon, Yeo One and Yanan for stepping up" and "be satisfactory singers in their own right" as the group's "vocal powerhouses" Jinho and Hui were absent. She also describes the song "undoubtedly catchy", though she felt "the song starts off with a misplaced '60s-inspired doo-wop intro that sets an entirely wrong tone for the song. It soon takes an abrupt shift to an early-2000s pop rock sound, which seems like a precarious middle ground between the harder sound of the group’s recent releases (‘Daisy’ and ‘Dr. BeBe’) and the brighter pop sound of their earlier hits ("Shine" and "Naughty Boy"), and only then does the song finally find its footing, and concluded that "sing-along chorus is just enough to save the song".

Commercial performance
The song debuted at number 60 on South Korea's Gaon Digital Chart with Gaon index of 7,119,656, and number 5 on Gaon Download Chart on the chart issue dated March 14–20, 2021.

Track listing
Download and streaming – Love or Take
 "Do or Not" – 3:08

Digital single
 "Do or Not (English Ver.)" – 3:08
 "Do or Not (Chinese Ver.)" – 3:08

 Download and streaming – Do or Not

 "Do or Not (Japanese Ver.)" – 3:08

Credits and personnel
Credits are adapted from Cube Entertainment, NetEase Music, and Melon.

Song credits

 Pentagon – Vocals
 Hui  – Composer, songwriter, background vocal
 Wooseok – Composer, songwriter
 Yan An - Vocal guide (Chinese version)
 NATHAN – Composer, audio engineer, bass, drum, piano, synthesizer 
 Gabriel Brandes – English translation (English version)
 Arys Chien – Chinese translation (Chinese version)
 Shoko Fujibayashi – Japanese translation (Japanese version)
 Soulman – Background vocal
 Kim Dong-min – Guitar
 Shin Jae-bin  – Record engineering
 Choi Ye-ji  – Record engineering
 Jeon Bu-yeon – Digital editing
 Mr. Cho  – Audio mixing
 Kwon Nam-woo  – Audio mastering
 Jang Seung-ho  – Assistant audio mastering

Visual credits
 Digipedi – music video director

Promotion
To promote "Do or Not", Pentagon appeared and performed on several South Korean music programs including Mnet's M! Countdown, KBS's Music Bank, MBC's Show! Music Core, SBS's Inkigayo and SBS MTV's The Show.

Music video
The music video for "Do or Not" was directed by Digipedi, and was uploaded to Pentagon's official YouTube channel on March 15, 2021. The music video garnered 1.3 million views, two days after its released, and exceeded 5 million views, four days later. The video sees the members of Pentagon all competing to try to win the love of the same girl. As they all try various adorable ways of impressing her like sharing the same headphones, dancing, and magic tricks, they come to realize that their friendships are what's most important. Emlyn Travis from BuzzFeed noted that the music video "not only the perfect fit for the song's upbeat melody and cheeky lyrics, but it also features the group's leader Hui who recently enlisted in the military last month, so it's especially sweet for fans."

Accolades

Charts

Release history

References

External links
 

2021 singles
2021 songs
Pentagon (South Korean band) songs
Cube Entertainment singles
Korean-language songs
Songs written by Hui (singer)
Songs written by Wooseok